The Canadian Office and Professional Employees Union (COPE) is a Canadian labour union representing approximately 35,000 white-collar workers, in both the private and public sectors, in 44 locals across Canada.

Composed of former locals of the American-based Office and Professional Employees International Union (OPEIU), in 2004 73 per cent of Canadian members voted in favour of forming their own, autonomous Canadian union. In June of that year, Canadian delegates withdrew from proceedings at the OPEIU international convention and formed their own national union – the Canadian Office and Professional Employees Union (COPE) and, in Quebec,  (SEPB).

External links
 

Canadian Labour Congress
Trade unions established in 2004